Alligator meat is the meat from alligators that is for consumption. It has been used both historically and in contemporary times in various cuisines of the Southern United States. Alligator eggs are also for consumption. Alligator meat is high in protein and low in fat, and has a mild flavor and firm texture.

In the United States, outside of a short legal hunting season in some states, it can only be legally sourced from alligator farms.  Farmed gator meat is available for consumer purchase in specialty food stores, some grocery stores, and can also be mail ordered. Some U.S. companies process and market alligator meat derived only from the tail of alligators. It can also be made into pet food.

Composition 
A  reference serving of alligator meat provides  of food energy, 29 grams of protein, 3 percent fat and 65 milligrams of cholesterol. It also contains a significant amount of phosphorus, potassium, vitamin B12, niacin and monounsaturated fatty acids.

Alligator meat has been described as having a mild flavor and a firm texture. It tastes like quail, with a mildly fishy flavor, and is often chewy, depending on preparation.

Preparation 
Various methods of preparation and cooking exist, including tenderization, marination, deep frying, stewing, roasting, smoking and sauteeing. Alligator meat is used in dishes such as gumbo, and is used in traditional Louisiana Creole cuisine. 

Cuts from the animal used include meat from the animal's tail and backbone, which have been described as "the choicest cuts".

History

United States 
In the mid-1800s, alligator meat was used in some regional cuisines in parts of the Southern United States. During this time, it was used in dishes such as gumbo.

Alligator eggs were a part of the cuisine in many areas of the Southern United States in the early 1900s. During this time people would harvest the eggs and then sell them as a source of income.

Harvesting of wild alligator eggs is illegal without a proper permit; violators face serious fines and jail time.

Legal status

United States 
In the United States, alligator hunting is legal in Arkansas, South Carolina, Louisiana, Florida, Georgia, and Texas. Additionally, the meat can be sourced from alligator farms.

See also 

 Game (hunting)
 Crocodile

References 
.

Further reading 
 The Culinary Herpetologist. p. 132.

External links 
 

Alligators and humans
Meat by animal
Cuisine of the Southern United States